Kyipwayay (lit. "Growth") was a pre-World War II Burmese language monthly magazine, closely identified with the Khit-San Sarpay movement, the first modern literary movement in the history of Burmese literature. The magazine was founded by U Thein in Yangon but later taken over by U Hla and moved to Mandalay in 1933. The monthly was published even during the Japanese occupation of the country (1942–1945). After the war, U Hla transformed Kyipwayay into the Ludu Journal.

References

Bibliography
 

Burmese magazines